Bilious Paths is the sixth studio album by the British IDM producer μ-Ziq, released on Planet Mu in 2003.

Critical reception
John Bush of AllMusic gave the album 4 stars out of 5, writing, "Highlights abound, but this is definitely one for those used to the blend of heavy innovation and occasional inanity to be found on nearly every μ-Ziq record." Matt Gonzales of PopMatters wrote, "Bilious Paths is further proof that μ-Ziq is an indisputable giant in the IDM world, even if few people can see him."

Track listing

References

External links
 

2003 albums
Mike Paradinas albums
Planet Mu albums